Florida State Prison (FSP), otherwise known as Raiford Prison, is a correctional institution located in unincorporated Bradford County, Florida. It was formerly known as the "Florida State Prison-East Unit" as it was originally part of Florida State Prison in Raiford, Florida (now known as Union Correctional Institution). The facility, a part of the Florida Department of Corrections, is located on State Road 16 right across the border from Union County. The institution opened in 1961, even though construction was not completed until 1968. With a maximum population of over 1,400 inmates, FSP is one of the largest prisons in the state. FSP houses one of the state's three death row cell blocks, and the state's execution chamber. Union Correctional Institution also houses male death row inmates while Lowell Annex houses female death row inmates.

Lethal injection became the standard method of execution in 2000. The electric chair can still be used by request of the inmate.

FSP sits in the center of several other prisons. It is surrounded by New River Correctional Institution, New River O-Unit, FSP West Unit, and sits across the river from Union Correctional Institution. Even though Union Correctional Institution is on the same property, immediately north-west of FSP, the county line (with Union County) runs in between the two, which makes Raiford the United States Postal Service address city of Union Correctional Institution, while Starke is the USPS address city of Florida State Prison.

FSP is Florida's only prison that is officially named "prison", with the other institutions being named "Correctional Institutions" (or "Correctional Facility" if it is a privately contracted prison).

Notable inmates

Former
 Mark DeFriest – Mark DeFriest, known as the Houdini of Florida, is a prisoner of the United States. In 1980, 19-year-old DeFriest retrieved work tools his recently deceased father had willed him before the will officially went through probate. This act was considered theft despite the fact DeFriest did not have an understanding of probate laws. DeFriest’s stepmother called the police, which led to his arrest. DeFriest was sentenced to four years in prison. The original four-year sentence has since developed into 34 years for 13 escape attempts, 7 of them successful, and hundreds of disciplinary reports for minor infractions. In 34 years, he’s collectively spent 27 of them in solitary confinement.

In custody
 John Connolly, former FBI agent convicted for ties to Whitey Bulger.
 Phillup Partin, convicted for the murder of 16-year-old hitchhiker Joshan Ashbrook.
 Daniel Lugo, convicted of murdering a couple. His story is the basis for the 2013 blockbuster Pain & Gain.
 Mark Sievers, orchestrated the murder of his wife Teresa Sievers in Bonita Springs. His co-conspirators, Jimmy Ray Rodgers and Curtis Wayne Wright, were also charged. Wright took a plea deal of 25 years for second degree murder for testimony at the other trials. Rodgers was sentenced to life without parole and Sievers was given the death penalty.

Executed

 Mark Asay – Lethal injection on August 24, 2017, (aged 53), for 2 Jacksonville murders.
 Oscar Ray Bolin – Lethal injection on January 7, 2016, (aged 53), for 3 Tampa Bay murders.
 Gary Ray Bowles – Lethal injection on August 22, 2019, (aged 57), convicted of 3 murders.
 Judy Buenoano – Electric chair on March 30, 1998, (aged 54).
 Ted Bundy – Electric chair on January 24, 1989, (aged 42), after confessing to over 30 killings dating from 1970s.
 Oba Chandler – Lethal injection on November 15, 2011, (aged 65).
 Juan Carlos Chavez – Lethal injection on February 12, 2014, (aged 46), for the murder of Jimmy Ryce.
 Allen Lee Davis – Electric chair on July 8, 1999, (aged 54), for 3 counts of first-degree murder.
 Donald Dillbeck – Lethal injection on February 23, 2023, (aged 59) 
 John Errol Ferguson – Lethal injection on August 5, 2013, (aged 65), for 8 murders.
 Marvin Francois – Electric chair on May 29, 1985, (aged 39), for 6 murders.
 David Alan Gore – Lethal injection on April 12, 2012, (aged 68), for the murder of 6 women.
 Marshall Lee Gore – Lethal injection on October 1, 2013, (aged 50), for the murder of 2 women.
 Martin Grossman – Lethal injection on February 16, 2010, (aged 45).
 Paul Jennings Hill – Lethal injection on September 3, 2003 (aged 49).
 Thomas Knight – Lethal injection on January 7, 2014 (aged 62).
 Bobby Joe Long – Lethal injection on May 23, 2019, (aged 65), convicted of 10 murders.
 Danny Rolling – Lethal injection on October 25, 2006, (aged 52).
 John Spenkelink – Electric chair on May 25, 1979, (aged 30).
 Gerald Stano – Electric chair on March 23, 1998, (aged 46).
 Robert Austin Sullivan – Electric chair on November 30, 1983, (aged 36).
 Beauford White – Electric chair on August 28, 1987, (aged 41), for 6 murders.
 Aileen Wuornos – Lethal injection on October 9, 2002, (aged 46). 
 Giuseppe Zangara – Electric chair on March 20, 1933, (aged 32), convicted of murder in the assassination of Chicagoan mayor Anton Cermak and who may have been sent to assassinate President-elect Franklin Delano Roosevelt at Bayfront Park in Miami, Florida, on February 15, 1933.

Died
 John Couey – Natural causes in prison on September 30, 2009, (aged 51), died in prison before execution could be carried out.
 Gerard Schaefer – Murdered by another prisoner on December 3, 1995, (aged 49).
 Ottis Toole – Cirrhosis in prison on September 15, 1996, (aged 49).
 Frank Valdes – Stun gunned & beaten with correctional officer boots in prison on July 17, 1999 (aged 36).

In popular culture
The Mind of Mark DeFriest is a documentary film about Florida State Prison inmate Mark DeFriest.
Lynyrd Skynyrd's song "Four Walls of Raiford" tells the story of a convict who escapes from the Florida State Prison; The convict is a veteran returning from the Vietnam War and pleads his case that he was wrongly convicted for armed robbery and asks to be buried with full honors if he gets caught.
In Spawn: The Undead Issue #9, the story takes place in Florida State Penitentiary where a death row inmate encounters Spawn.
It was referred to in the show Blue Bloods in Season 2 Episode 15 "The Life We Choose".
 In the 1997 Arthur Hailey novel Detective a police detective in Miami is driven in a marked cruiser for over four hours to hear the confession of a man on death row at Raiford. The book also mentions that Florida State Prison is technically not in Raiford but across the road in the town of Starke.
 In 2021, Americana/blues artist Shane Kelley released the song "Bradford County Blues" which is the story of a man locked up in Raiford.

References

External links
 Florida State Prison —Florida Department of Corrections

1961 establishments in Florida
Buildings and structures in Bradford County, Florida
Capital punishment in Florida
Execution sites in the United States
Government agencies established in 1961
Prisons in Florida